The 1964 Gael Linn Cup is a representative competition for elite level participants in the women's team field sport of camogie, was won by Munster, who defeated Leinster in the final, played at Cahir.

Arrangements
Peggy Dorgan scored 3–1 (she was to miss the final through injury) as five counties, all except Kerry, were represented on the Munster team that defeated Ulster by 7–3 to 2–4 at Roscrea. Connacht were unable to travel to meet Leinster and withdrew from the competition. In the other semi-final, The Griffin sisters, Terry and Kathleen, withdrew from the Munster team for the final at Cahir owing to the death of their father. The final was level four times before a Late Ann Carroll point enabled Munster to defeat Leinster 2–6 to 3–2 to retain the trophy. Agnes Hourigan wrote in the Irish Press: Munster had more of the play territorially but faulty shooting cost them many scores. After a switch in the Leinster team between Judy Doyle and Mary Walsh brought a great rally and a goal and a point which put Leinster in front, Munster put in a great finish when they drew level and then went ahead with a point to snatch victory.

Final stages

|}

References

External links
 Camogie Association

1964 in camogie
1964